The Supreme Soviet of the Moldavian SSR (Moldovan: Советул Супрем ал РСС Молдовенешть, Sovietul Suprem al RSS Moldovenești; Russian: Верховный Совет Молдавской ССР tr. Verkhovnyy Sovet Moldavskoy SSR) was the supreme soviet (main legislative institution) of the Moldavian SSR and later the independent Republic of Moldova from 1941 to 1993. The last elections of the Supreme Soviet of the Moldavian SSR were held in 1990 and 371 deputies were elected.

Convocations 
On May 23, 1991, the 12th convocation of the Supreme Soviet of the Moldavian SSR became the first Parliament of the Republic of Moldova.

 1st Convocation (1941-1946)
 2nd Convocation (1947-1950)
 3rd Convocation (1951-1954)
 4th Convocation (1955-1959)
 5th Convocation (1959-1962)
 6th Convocation (1963-1966)
 7th Convocation (1967-1970)
 8th Convocation (1971-1974)
 9th Convocation (1975-1979)
 10th Convocation (1980-1984)
 11th Convocation (1985-1989)
 12th Convocation (1990-1993)

Chairmen of the Supreme Soviet

Chairmen of the Presidium of the Supreme Soviet

See also 

 Supreme Soviet
 Parliament of Moldova
 Supreme Council (Transnistria)

References 

Historical legislatures

Moldavian Soviet Socialist Republic
1941 establishments in the Soviet Union
1993 disestablishments in Moldova
Moldavian